Birds of Pray is the seventh studio album by Live, released in 2003. The first single, "Heaven" became the band's most successful single in several years, reaching number 59 on the Billboard Hot 100. Birds of Pray was Live's final release on Radioactive/MCA. They signed with Epic in 2005.

Background
Ed Kowalczyk's lyrics on this album return to the spiritual territory of The Distance to Here. Guitarist Chad Taylor explained that the tensions between Kowalczyk and the other three members that eventually caused the band to split from him surfaced in 1999, and had grown worse during the album's recording sessions. "I wasn't sure how our rocker fanbase would feel about the lyrics." He expressed his frustration with the album by adding, "Jim Wirt (producer) worked really hard to fashion a contemporary album, but it never felt like the Live I loved."

Reception

Birds of Pray debuted at number 28 on the Billboard 200, selling over 37,000 copies in its first week of release. By August 2005 it had sold 273,000 copies in the US. The album failed to reach gold status in the US, although it outsold 2001's V. The album received mixed reviews from critics and has a rating of 50 out of 100 on Metacritic.

AllMusic disliked Kowalczyk's lyrics, claiming they were "Either too literal or bewilderingly obtuse" and said that the album was, "Still recognizably Live...big, big guitars, sweeping anthemic choruses, earnest ballads, mildly histrionic vocals...but it's a little more subdued and a little more serious and quite streamlined...The biggest problem with the record is that the eye is on the big picture...to the extent that the individual moments aren't all that memorable, clearly lacking singles as forceful as those that fueled Throwing Copper." AllMusic concluded by claiming that, "Live is growing up and settling down, turning into a solid thirty-something rock band."

Shaking Through described the album's lyrics as, "Self righteous" and "Unintentionally humorous." It claimed that, "the songs are a procession of brittle riffs" and concluded by saying, "Birds of Pray just seems clueless, like a high school kid who doesn't realize that his strident need to seem interesting just makes him a joke."

Track listing
All songs written by Ed Kowalczyk except where noted.

"Heaven" – 3:49
"She" – 2:40
"The Sanctity of Dreams" – 3:33
"Run Away" – 3:53
"Life Marches On" – 2:53
"Like I Do" (Kowalczyk, Patrick Dahlheimer, Chad Taylor) – 4:14
"Sweet Release" – 3:02
"Everytime I See Your Face" – 3:16
"Lighthouse" (Kowalczyk, Taylor) – 3:08
"River Town" – 4:09
"Out to Dry" – 3:20
"Bring the People Together" – 3:02
"What Are We Fighting For?" – 3:21

British bonus tracks
"Forever May Not Be Long Enough" (Egyptian Dreams Remix) – 4:07
"Overcome" (Live from Philadelphia) – 4:23

Special edition bonus DVD
Live tracks recorded during the 2002 Pinkpop Festival in the Netherlands.

"Selling the Drama"
"Voodoo Lady"
"Nobody Knows"
"White Discussion"

Personnel
Live
Ed Kowalczyk – lead vocals, rhythm guitar, backing vocals 
Chad Taylor – lead guitar, backing vocals
Patrick Dahlheimer – bass
Chad Gracey – drums

Additional musicians
Paul Buckmaster – conductor, string arrangements
Larry Corbett – cello
Joel Derouin – violin
Bruce Dukov – violin
Suzie Katayama – orchestra manager
Patrick Warren – chamberlin
Evan Wilson – viola

Technical personnel
Michael Attardi – assistant engineering
Neil Couser – assistant engineering
CJ Eiriksson – digital editing
Femio Hernández – assistant engineering
John Ikuma – assistant engineer
Ted Jensen – mastering
Phil Kaffel – engineering
Okhee Kim – assistant engineering
Tom Lord-Alge – mixing
Jeff Robinette – assistant engineering
P.J. Smith – assistant engineering
Michael Wilson – photography
Jim Wirt – production, engineering
Jesse Wright – design

Charts

Weekly charts

Year-end charts

Singles

A: "Heaven" did not chart on the Flemish Ultratop 50, but peaked at number 6 on the Ultratip chart.

Certifications

References

2003 albums
Live (band) albums
Radioactive Records albums